Linton Semage is an actor in Sri Lankan cinema, theatre and television as well a filmmaker. He is best known for his roles in movies such as Padadaya (1998), Sulang Kirilli (2002) and Mad Cowgirl (2006). He started his acting career in 1978 from the movie Sara, which was directed by T. Arjuna.  He won the Sarasaviya Best Actor Award (1995) and Presidential Film Award (1999) for the best actor, for his role in movie Mee Haraka.

Personal life
He was born in 1957 in Boossa, Galle. He completed education from Deva Pathiraja College and Galle Central School.

Career
In 1975, he moved Colombo with the ambition to be a dancer. Then he joined "Ranga Shilpa Shalika" in Lionel Wendt and started dancing under the guidance of Basil Mihiripenna. He then acted in Chithrasena's Karadiya, Dhamma Jagoda's Kora Saha Andaya and Wes Muhunu. He is one of the earliest member of street drama group formed by Gamini Haththotuwegama. His maiden television acting came through Sekkuwa directed by Parakrama Niriella with the role "Kiripussa". He won the excellence award at State Drama Festivals for that role. He continued to act in many popular critically acclaimed stage drama such as Maname, Sinhabahu, Wedikkarayo, Ran Salakuna, Punthila, Pansa Deke Hansaya, Ath and Mora.

He produced the play Panchayudha, which is his only stage production. He went India for a drama course at Indian National Drama Theater. In 1978, he played his maiden cinema acting through Saara directed by T. Arjuna with the role as a waiter. He acted in short films such as Palamuwaniya Saha Anthimaya by Niriella and Cindrellage Sereppuwa by P.U.D Perera. His most notable cinema acting came through 1994 film Mee Haraka directed by I.N Hewawasam. In that year, he won the Sarasaviya award for the Best Actor for his role Gunapala in that film.

He acted in few television serials, including, Nadee Geethaya, Irata Handana Mal, Indrakeelaya, Kokila Ginna, Magul Sakwala and Iti Pahan. He also produced two serials Akaradaruwa and Deweni Kameththa.

Filmography

Main Actor / Actor

 No. denotes the Number of Sri Lankan film in the Sri Lankan cinema.

Director
 1999 	Paadadaya
 2002 	Mage Wam Atha

Producer
 1999 	Paadadaya

Awards
 Presidential Film Awards
1999 - Best Actor (Mee Haraka)

2002 - Best Supporting Actor (Sudu Sevaneli)

 Sarasaviya Awards
1995 - Best Actor (Mee Haraka)

Dhaka International Film Festival

2000 Best Film - Padadaya (The Outcast)

2000 Best Director - Padadaya (The Outcast)

See also
 Cinema of Sri Lanka

References

External links
බිංදුවෙන් පටන්ගෙන ඉහළටම නැගි ලින්ටන් සේමගේ

Sri Lankan male film actors
Sinhalese male actors
People from Ambalangoda
Sri Lankan film directors
Living people
1957 births